XEOJN-AM (La Voz de la Chinantla – "The Voice of la Chinantla") is an indigenous community radio station that broadcasts in Spanish, Mazatec, Cuicatec and Chinantec from San Lucas Ojitlán, in the Mexican state of Oaxaca.  It is run by the Cultural Indigenist Broadcasting System (SRCI) of the National Commission for the Development of Indigenous Peoples (CDI).  The frequency is 950 kHz.

External links
XEOJN website

References

Indigenous peoples of Oaxaca
Chinantec-language radio stations
Cuicatec-language radio stations
Mazatecan-language radio stations
Radio stations in Oaxaca
Sistema de Radiodifusoras Culturales Indígenas
Radio stations established in 1991
Daytime-only radio stations in Mexico